The 1935 Miami Hurricanes football team represented the University of Miami as a member of the Southern Intercollegiate Athletic Association (SIAA) in the 1935 college football season. The Hurricanes played their home games at Moore Park in Miami, Florida. The team was coached by Irl Tubbs, in his first year as head coach for the Hurricanes.

Schedule

References

Miami
Miami Hurricanes football seasons
Miami Hurricanes football